Megan Prescott (born 4 June 1991) is an English actress and bodybuilder who is best known for her role as Katie Fitch in the double BAFTA-winning teen drama Skins.

Background
Prescott was born in Palmers Green, London, and is six minutes younger than her twin sister Kathryn Prescott, who is also an actress. She also has a younger brother. She received her primary education at Palmers Green High School, secondary schooling at St. John's Senior School, and Ashmole for her Sixth Form College education. She also studied television production with a special in directing at university. Prior to professional acting Prescott and her sister attended weekly drama classes where they would eventually meet future co-star Lily Loveless.

She was represented by Matt Wynter of Insanity Artists Management, Prescott was later represented by Ken Mcreddie Associates.

Career
Although Prescott made her acting debut in a episode of the BBC soap opera Doctors along with her twin sister Kathryn in 2008, she made her breakthrough in acting as Katie Fitch in the third series of Skins the following year. She and her sister, who plays Katie's identical twin Emily Fitch on the show, began filming the third series of Skins in July 2008 and went on to reprise their roles for the fourth series of the show as well. In relation to her work with Skins, Prescott appeared as a correspondent at open auditions for the show, the official "Skins Parties", and at channel 4's T4 on the Beach with the cast on a number of occasions. 

In 2013 Megan appeared as Jade Podfer on the British drama Holby City and in a horror movie Shortcuts To Hell: Volume 1, as well as feature film Sleeping Rough.

Since 2016 Prescott has been pursuing bodybuilding. Ahead of competing in the finals of the UKBFF Bikini Fitness finals she appeared on the reality show Body Fixers.

Filmography

References

External links 
 

1991 births
Living people
British identical twins
English television actresses
Actresses from London
English twins
Identical twin actresses
People educated at Palmers Green High School
People from Palmers Green